Jem Irene Cassar-Daley is an Australian indie pop singer and songwriter. She is the daughter of country music singer Troy Cassar-Daley and TV presenter Laurel Edwards and is a Gumbaynggirr Bundjalung woman.

Early life and education

Jem Cassar-Daley's parents are Laurel Edwards, a television presenter, radio announcer and singer, and Troy Cassar-Daley, a country music singer-songwriter and musician. She is a Gumbaynggirr Bundjalung woman and has a sibling. In 2022 Cassar-Daley explained that she had been "sung to in the womb" and that The Sound of White by Missy Higgins was the first album she bought, "I love her (Higgins) and still do."

Career

2021-present: I Don't Know Who to Call

Cassar-Daley released her debut single "Letting Go" in July 2021. Her seven-track debut extended play, I Don't Know Who to Call appeared in May 2022. It includes previous singles "Letting Go", "Changes", "Like it More" and "Oh No". In September of that year the artist issued a mini-documentary of the same name to explain the origins of the EP's tracks. For the doco she worked with James Angus, Ali Barter, Jen Boyce, Tom Eggert and Tia Gostelow.

Discography

Extended plays

Awards and nominations

National Indigenous Music Awards

The National Indigenous Music Awards is an annual awards ceremony that recognises the achievements of Indigenous Australians in music. The award ceremony commenced in 2004. Electric Fields have won one award from four nominations.

! 
|-
| rowspan="2"| 2022
| Jem Cassar-Daley
| New Talent of the Year
| 
| rowspan="2"| 
|-
| I Don't Know Who to Call
| Album of the Year
|

Queensland Music Awards
The Queensland Music Awards (previously known as Q Song Awards) are annual awards celebrating Queensland, Australia's brightest emerging artists and established legends. They commenced in 2006.

 (wins only)
! 
|-
| 2022
| Letting Go"
| Indigenous Award
| 
| 
|}

References 

Indigenous Australian musicians
Living people
Year of birth missing (living people)